Hampson v Department of Education and Science [1989] ICR 179 is a UK labour law case, concerning the test for justification of discrimination.

Facts
A language teacher from Hong Kong had done a two-year training course at home. She came to the UK where the requirement was for three year qualifications. She did a further one-year training course. The Secretary of State refused to recognise her qualification as comparable, because her three years was not consecutive. She argued this was race discrimination. However, the Secretary of State argued it fell within the exception under the Race Relations Act 1976 section 41 (acts done under statutory authority).

Judgment
The Court of Appeal, upholding the EAT, found for the Department under RRA 1976 section 41. Balcombe LJ, dissenting, would have remitted the case to tribunal to assess justification. He set out the current approach for justification, relying on Rainey v Greater Glasgow Health Board which incorporated the test given in Bilka-Kaufhaus.

See also

UK labour law
EU labour law

United Kingdom labour case law
1989 in case law
1989 in British law
Court of Appeal (England and Wales) cases